FC Metallurg-Oskol Stary Oskol was a Russian football club from Stary Oskol, founded in 1997. It played in the Russian Second Division. Their first professional season was 2008. The team was called Zodiak Stary Oskol before 2009. During the winter break of the 2013/14 season, the team dropped out of professional competition due to lack of financing.

External links
Official Website

Association football clubs established in 1997
Football clubs in Russia
Sport in Stary Oskol
1997 establishments in Russia
Association football clubs disestablished in 2014
2013 disestablishments in Russia